The Sellers House (also known as Calvary Church Rectory) in the Shadyside neighborhood of  in Pittsburgh, Pennsylvania is a building from 1858. It was listed on the National Register of Historic Places in 1979. In 1996, it was professionally restored by Samuel Land Company of Pittsburgh, PA.

References

Houses on the National Register of Historic Places in Pennsylvania
Second Empire architecture in Pennsylvania
Italianate architecture in Pennsylvania
Houses completed in 1858
Houses in Pittsburgh
City of Pittsburgh historic designations
Pittsburgh History & Landmarks Foundation Historic Landmarks
National Register of Historic Places in Pittsburgh